Haluwas is an historical  village in the Bhiwani district of the Indian state of Haryana. , the village had 715 households with a total population of 3,910 of which 2,104 were male and 1,806 female.

Two Panchayat History
At the time of British rule, the ruling area of the village was divided into two parts. One which was ruled by British was known as Angreji Pana and one which was ruled by Regional King was known as raja Pana. Since then, the village has two partition ruling even though it is a small village and there is no any physical divider in between the village. Since 1947 to 2009 for MLA elections also raja PAna was under Bhiwani Halka and Angreji Pana was in Tosham Halka. So for a small village there were two MLAs. After the 2009 State Assembly Election, now both parts are added into Bhiwani Halka. So now only one MLA is There but there are still two Panchayats one is called Haluwas and another Haluwas Majra Devsar.

BABA BALAKNATH ASHRAM
This village is famous for the ashram of Baba Balaknath ji. Baba Balaknath ji is sidh baba having 500 years old History. Babaji disappeared into earth but he left one of his finger above earth and his samadhi was built on the same place. Baba Balaknath fulfills all the wishes of people who come there for Smadhi darshan. There are several other Smadhis of BABAs who were follower of Nath Sadhu Community in this Ashram.

BABA PREMNATH  SMADHI is also there with in this Temple which is very famous for miracles done by baba premnath. People come and pray to Baba premnath for their wishes, once wish is complete people offer wines and another alcoholic drinks to Baba in worship.

Mugal History and Village Fairs of Baba THAKUR CHANDRBHAN SINGH TANWAR (Haluwas) and Dadi Sati (Haluwas Majra Devsar) 

There is a very interesting story from Mugal times which shows the rich history of the village. Once Mugal Sena abducted hundred of girls from nearby villages and they were taking them to Mugal palace. Mugal used to abduct young girls and forcefully keep them in their palace for sex and slavery. One person of Haluwas Village called Thakur ChanderBhan along with his friends attacked on Mugal Army and fought guerilla Fight and freed around 300  Girls at that time. For this victory every year one fair is organized in Village in memory of ChanderBhan.

After some time many Village people went in a baarat for marriage in a village called wazirpur and killed mostly people who went into that marriage. The marriage was done and groom was also killed. The Bride came along the neck of groom in village and sehe wanted to be sati (setting herself on fire with groom).But Village People did not allow her to be sati on village. So she went somewhere else and she set herself on fire and became Sati. Now in village every year one fair is organized by Rajput Caste peoples in memory of Dadi Sati.

Religion and Caste
All People living in village are Hindu. There are Rajput caste people are more in numbers after that Brahman communities people are also in good number. There are several other castes like Khati, Bania, Kumhar, Chamar, Balmiki, Dhanak, Meena etc.

References

Villages in Bhiwani district